Aboubakar "Bouba" Sidibé (born 3 May 1996) is a French professional footballer who plays as a forward for Belgian First Division B club Virton.

Career 
Sidibé began his career at Clermont. He left the club in 2017, and went on to play for Fréjus Saint-Raphaël and Thiers. In 2020, he returned to Clermont on an amateur contract. On 4 January 2022, Sidibé joined Belgian club Virton, where he signed his first professional contract.

Personal life 
Born in France, Sidibé is of Malian descent. He has both French and Malian citizenship.

References

External links 
 
 

1996 births
Living people
French footballers
Malian footballers
Citizens of Mali through descent
French sportspeople of Malian descent
Black French sportspeople
Association football forwards
Clermont Foot players
ÉFC Fréjus Saint-Raphaël players
SA Thiers players
R.E. Virton players
Championnat National 3 players
Ligue 2 players
Championnat National 2 players
Ligue 1 players
French expatriate footballers
Expatriate footballers in Belgium
French expatriate sportspeople in Belgium